The 2017 Merlion Cup was the 11th edition of the Merlion Cup, an invitational club basketball tournament organized by the Basketball Association of Singapore.

The Adelaide 36ers from Australia won the title by defeating the defending champions Shanghai Sharks from China, 101-81, for their maiden championship, and the second for Australia, with Melbourne Tigers winning it in 1994.

Participating teams

Results

Group stage

Group A

Group B

Final round

5th-7th Classification

Semifinals

5th-7th Classification

Third place game

Final

Final standing

References

2017
2017–18 in Asian basketball
2017–18 in Singaporean basketball
September 2017 sports events in Asia